Greektown is a commercial and entertainment district in Detroit, Michigan, located just northeast of the heart of downtown, along Monroe Avenue between Brush and St. Antoine streets. It has a station by that name on the city's elevated downtown transit system known as the Detroit People Mover. Greektown is situated between the Renaissance Center, Comerica Park, and Ford Field. 

Named for the historic Greek immigrant community of the early 20th century, the district still has Greek-themed restaurants. Notable buildings include St. Mary Roman Catholic Church (originally built for the former ethnic German congregation of the parish), Second Baptist Church, the Atheneum Suite Hotel, and the contemporary  Hollywood Casino at Greektown (formerly TRAPPER’S ALLEY opened in 1972 by Frances and David Sonne’) within its boundaries. The district was listed on the National Register of Historic Places in 1982. The district is often the site of the Greek community parade in March.

History

The area known today as Greektown was first settled in the 1830s by German immigrants, who created a primarily residential neighborhood in the area. However, in the earliest years of the 20th century, most of the ethnic German residents, who had gotten established in the city, began moving from the neighborhood into newer residential areas farther from downtown. As they left, a new wave of Greek immigrants moved into this older housing. Theodore Gerasimos was the first documented Greek immigrant in Detroit. The newly arrived Greeks soon established their own businesses in the neighborhood.

By the 1920s, the area was developing more commercial structures, and the Greek residents began moving out in turn to newer housing. But the restaurants, stores, and coffeehouses they established remained. The next thirty years brought a melange of immigrants to the few residential spaces left in the neighborhood. Redevelopment in the 1960s led to the neighborhood becoming the site of new municipal buildings and parking.

Realizing the culturally significant neighborhood was at risk, Detroit's ethnic Greek leaders banded together. With the help of the Mayor's office, the streetscape and building exteriors were improved, and additional street lighting was installed. The neighborhood threw a Greek festival in 1966, timed to coincide with Fourth of July celebrations. The festival was a success, and was continued for years until turnout grew too large. By that time, Greektown was firmly established in Detroit. The Greektown Historic District was listed on the National Register of Historic Places in 1982.

Changes continue, and as of June 2012 only three full-fledged Greek restaurants remain in Greektown. The neighborhood is a popular restaurant and entertainment district, having many restaurants that serve authentic Greek cuisine, and one of the city's three casinos, Hollywood Casino at Greektown. Certain buildings on Monroe Street feature themes related to the mythical Pegasus, and such historic Greek structures as the Parthenon, and other ancient architecture. Greek music is played on Monroe Street throughout the day. Well-known restaurants include The New Parthenon, The Golden Fleece, Bakaliko Cafe, Cyprus Taverna, Pegasus Taverna, Pizza Papalis, and Fishbone's Rhythm Kitchen Cafe. The Detroit People Mover has a station at the Hollywood Casino on Beaubien Street between Monroe Street and Lafayette Boulevard.

In popular culture
Greektown is featured in the video game Midnight Club 3: DUB Edition (2005).

In the American cable TV series Low Winter Sun (2013), the Detroit Police precinct is located four blocks from Greektown. Maya and Damon "kick up" tributes from her bar and from their drug and prostitution earnings to Skelos, Greektown's main crime lord. Seeking to gain independence from Skelos, Damon opens a blind pig outside of Greektown, where he kicks up to Reverend Lowdown (season 1, episodes 3 and 4).

See also

 History of the Greek Americans in Metro Detroit
 Greektown station

References

External links

Greektown Merchants Association

 
Neighborhoods in Detroit
Downtown Detroit
Ethnic enclaves in Michigan
Greek-American culture in Michigan
Greektowns in the United States
Historic districts in Detroit
Historic districts on the National Register of Historic Places in Michigan
National Register of Historic Places in Detroit